Sean Richardson may refer to:

 Sean Richardson (rugby league) (born 1973), rugby league footballer
 Sean Richardson (American football) (born 1990), American football safety